WBKY (95.9 FM) is a radio station broadcasting a country music format. Licensed to Portage, Wisconsin, United States, the station serves the Madison area.  The station is currently owned by Magnum Communications, Inc. and features programming from AP Radio and Jones Radio Network.

History
The station was assigned the call letters WVZO on 1992-09-02.  On 1992-10-12, the station changed its call sign to WZST, on 1994-07-01 to WUSX, and on 1996-03-29 to the current WBKY.

References

External links
Magnum Media Website

BKY
Country radio stations in the United States
Radio stations established in 1992